Longview School is a K-12 nonprofit private school located in the Village of Brewster, New York.

External links
School Website

Educational institutions in the United States with year of establishment missing
Private elementary schools in New York (state)
Private high schools in New York (state)
Private middle schools in New York (state)
Schools in Putnam County, New York